Sayyid Abd al-Razzaq al-Wahaab Tumah (1895 – August 10, 1958), was an Iraqi nobleman, and writer.

He is known for his most notable work, Karbala Fi al-Tarikh (Karbala in History) which consisted of 3 volumes.

Biography 
al-Wahaab was born in 1885 to Abd al-Wahaab Tumah (d. 1928), the mayor of Karbala in 1926. He is from the Tumah branch of the Al Faiz family. His grandfather, and his brothers, took on the family name of al-Wahaab, after their father, Wahaab Tumah, the governor of Karbala; custodian of the Imam Husayn shrine (1823–1826); custodian of the al-Abbas shrine (1826–1829). His family name is not to be mistaken with the al-Wahaab family that branched from Al Zuhayk.

al-Wahaab was a distinguished in his writing, and witnessed most of the incidents of 1920 revolt, recording them in his books and publications. His works were featured many times in the press and magazines, namely in the al-Irfan, al-I'tidal, al-Sa'a, and Risalat al-Sharq.

He had a remarkable library in Karbala, with rare books and manuscripts. The library was destroyed during the 1991 uprising.

al-Wahaab died on Sunday, August 10, 1958 in Baghdad. His corpse was transferred to Karbala, and buried in the al-Abbas shrine.

References 

Iraqi writers
1880s births
1958 deaths
20th-century Iraqi people
20th-century Iraqi writers
People from Karbala